Tyrese Momodu Fornah (born 11 September 1999) is an English professional footballer who plays as a defensive midfielder for Reading on loan from Premier League club Nottingham Forest.

Club career
Fornah is a member of the Nottingham Forest academy, having joined following his release from Brighton & Hove Albion in the summer of 2018. He signed a contract with Forest on 11 December 2019 that would keep him at the club until the summer of 2022.

Fornah made his professional debut on 5 January 2020, appearing as a 69th-minute substitute during a 3rd round FA Cup game against Chelsea.

On 31 January 2020, Fornah moved on loan to Portuguese LigaPro side Casa Pia for the remainder of the season, making five appearances.

He signed for League One side Plymouth Argyle on 2 October 2020 on a season-long loan.

On 18 January 2022, Fornah joined League One side Shrewsbury Town on loan until the end of the season.

On 8 July 2022, it was announced that Fornah had signed on a season-long loan with Championship side Reading.

Personal life
Born in England, Fornah is of Ghanaian descent.

Career statistics

References

1999 births
Living people
English footballers
English sportspeople of Ghanaian descent
Footballers from Canning Town
Association football midfielders
Nottingham Forest F.C. players
Casa Pia A.C. players
Plymouth Argyle F.C. players
Shrewsbury Town F.C. players
Reading F.C. players
Liga Portugal 2 players
English Football League players
English expatriate footballers
Expatriate footballers in Portugal
English expatriate sportspeople in Portugal
Black British sportspeople